Conrad Yeatis "Sonny" Clark (July 21, 1931 – January 13, 1963) was an American jazz pianist and composer who mainly worked in the hard bop idiom.

Early life
Clark was born and raised in Herminie, Pennsylvania, a coal mining town east of Pittsburgh. His parents were originally from Stone Mountain, Georgia. His miner father, Emery Clark, died of a lung disease two weeks after Sonny was born. Sonny was the youngest of eight children. At age 12, he moved to Pittsburgh.

Later life and career
While visiting an aunt in California at age 20, Clark decided to stay and began working with saxophonist Wardell Gray. Clark went to San Francisco with Oscar Pettiford and after a couple months, was working with clarinetist Buddy DeFranco in 1953. Clark toured the United States and Europe with DeFranco until January 1956, when he joined The Lighthouse All-Stars, led by bassist Howard Rumsey.

Wishing to return to the east coast, Clark served as accompanist for singer Dinah Washington in February 1957 in order to relocate to New York City. In New York, Clark was often requested as a sideman by many musicians, partly because of his rhythmic comping. He frequently recorded for Blue Note Records as one of their house musicians, playing as a sideman with many hard bop players, including Kenny Burrell, Donald Byrd, Paul Chambers, John Coltrane, Dexter Gordon, Art Farmer, Curtis Fuller, Grant Green, Philly Joe Jones, Clifford Jordan, Jackie McLean, Hank Mobley, Art Taylor, and Wilbur Ware. He also recorded sessions with Charles Mingus, Sonny Rollins, Billie Holiday, Stanley Turrentine, and Lee Morgan.

As a leader, Clark recorded albums Dial "S" for Sonny (1957, Blue Note), Sonny's Crib (1957, Blue Note), Sonny Clark Trio (1957, Blue Note), Cool Struttin' (1958, Blue Note), Blues in the Night (1979, Blue Note, also released on Standards), and a second piano trio album titled Sonny Clark Trio (1960, Time Records).

Clark died in New York City on January 13, 1963 (aged 31). The official cause was listed as a heart attack, but the likely cause was a heroin overdose.

Legacy
Close friend and fellow jazz pianist Bill Evans dedicated the composition "NYC's No Lark" (an anagram of "Sonny Clark") to him after his death, included on Evans' Conversations with Myself (1963). John Zorn, Wayne Horvitz, Ray Drummond, and Bobby Previte recorded an album of Clark's compositions, Voodoo (1985), as the Sonny Clark Memorial Quartet. Zorn also recorded several of Clark's compositions with Bill Frisell and George E. Lewis on News for Lulu (1988) and More News for Lulu (1992).

Discography

As leader

Compilations
 Standards (Blue Note, 1998)

As sideman 
With Teddy Charles and the Westcoasters (1953)

With The Lighthouse All Stars (Contemporary Records 1956)

With Sonny Criss
 Go Man! (Imperial Records, 1956)
 Sonny Criss Plays Cole Porter (Imperial, 1956)

With Buddy DeFranco
 In a Mellow Mood (Verve, 1954)
 Cooking the Blues (Verve, 1955)
 Autumn Leaves (Verve, 1956)
 Sweet and Lovely (Verve, 1956)
 Jazz Tones (Verve, 1956)

With Curtis Fuller
 Bone & Bari (Blue Note, 1958) – recorded in 1957
 Curtis Fuller Volume 3 (Blue Note, 1961) – recorded in 1957
 Two Bones (Blue Note, 1980) – recorded in 1958

With Dexter Gordon
 Go (Blue Note, 1962)
 A Swingin' Affair (Blue Note, 1962)
 Landslide (Blue Note, 1980) – recorded in 1961-62

With Bennie Green
 Soul Stirrin' (Blue Note, 1958)
 Bennie Green Swings the Blues (Enrica, 1960)
 Bennie Green (Time, 1960)
 The 45 Session (Blue Note, 1975) – recorded in 1958

With Grant Green
 Gooden's Corner (Blue Note, 1980) – recorded in 1961
 Nigeria (Blue Note, 1980) – recorded in 1962
 Oleo (Blue Note, 1980) – recorded in 1962
 Born to Be Blue (Blue Note, 1985) – recorded in 1962
 The Complete Quartets with Sonny Clark  (Blue Note, 1997) – compilation

With Jackie McLean
 Jackie's Bag (Blue Note, 1959)
 A Fickle Sonance (Blue Note, 1961)
 Vertigo (Blue Note, 1962)
 Tippin' the Scales (Blue Note, 1962)

With Hank Mobley
 Hank Mobley (Blue Note, 1958) – recorded in 1957
 Poppin' (Blue Note, 1980) – recorded in 1957
 Curtain Call (Blue Note, 1984) – recorded in 1957

With Howard Rumsey's Lighthouse All Stars
 Mexican Passport (Contemporary, 1956)
 Music for Lighthousekeeping (Contemporary, 1956)
 Oboe/Flute (Contemporary, 1956)

With Stanley Turrentine
Stan "The Man" Turrentine (Time, 1963) – recorded in 1960
 Jubilee Shout!!! (Blue Note, 1986) – recorded in 1962

With others
 Tina Brooks, Minor Move (Blue Note, 1980) – recorded in 1958
 Serge Chaloff, Blue Serge (Capital, 1956)
 Lou Donaldson, Lou Takes Off (Blue Note, 1958) – recorded in 1957
 Johnny Griffin, The Congregation (Blue Note, 1957)
 John Jenkins, John Jenkins with Kenny Burrell (Blue Note, 1957)
 Philly Joe Jones, Showcase (Riverside, 1959)
 Clifford Jordan, Cliff Craft (Blue Note, 1957)
 Larance Marable, Tenorman featuring James Clay (Jazz: West, 1956)
 Lee Morgan, Candy (Blue Note, 1958)
 Ike Quebec, Easy Living (Blue Note, 1962)
 Sonny Rollins, The Sound of Sonny (Riverside, 1957)
 Frank Rosolino, I Play Trombone (Bethlehem, 1956)
 Louis Smith, Smithville (Blue Note, 1958)
 Cal Tjader, Tjader Plays Tjazz (Fantasy, 1956)
 Don Wilkerson, Preach Brother! (Blue Note, 1962)

References

External links
 Sonny Clark -Pittsburgh Music History

1931 births
1963 deaths
Hard bop pianists
Mainstream jazz pianists
Bebop pianists
Post-bop pianists
West Coast jazz pianists
American jazz pianists
American male pianists
People from Westmoreland County, Pennsylvania
Musicians from Pittsburgh
Blue Note Records artists
Xanadu Records artists
20th-century American pianists
Jazz musicians from Pennsylvania
20th-century American male musicians
American male jazz musicians